El Valle is one of eleven parishes (administrative divisions)  in Candamo, a municipality within the province and autonomous community of Asturias, in northern Spain. 

Villages
 Canales
 Candamin 
 El Valle

References

Parishes in Candamo